Elliot Bevan is a fictional character from the British Channel 4 soap opera Hollyoaks, played by Garnon Davies. He first appeared on 9 January 2007 as a new student. In July 2010, it was announced that Davies would be leaving the show. He made his final appearance on 15 November 2010. During his time on the show, Elliot was involved in storylines including a relationship with his friend Sarah Barnes (Loui Batley) and finding his long-lost father.

Character creation
Elliot was created in 2006 and on the day auditions were held and Davies had attended other castings. Of his Hollyoaks audition Davies stated: "The day I went for the audition I also had a casting for a McVities biscuits ad, I’m glad I got the one I did, but it was a weird audition. I remember thinking how many other boys there were on the day and how attractive they all were. I just thought they want good-looking guys like them, not me." (Carley Stenson) who plays Steph Cunningham in the serial, put in a good word to producers, helping him secure the role.

Davies has revealed that he had to escalate his Welsh accent to impress producers, stating: “They also really liked the Welsh thing – they went mad for it. They thought it just added to his geeky character,” he said, with a less pronounced Welsh accent than Elliot’s. I had to ham up my Welshness to fit in with the odd perception of Wales the producers had."

In 2010, it was announced Davies had quit Hollyoaks and would depart later in the year. His departure was confirmed at the same time as Glen Wallace, who portrays Malachy Fisher, and John Pickard (Dom Reilly)'s departures. Speaking of his decision to leave, Davies commented, "It's very strange to think that after four years I'll be leaving this place. It's been such a great experience and I've loved every minute — everybody says it but Hollyoaks really is a great place to work. I've made some amazing friends in the cast and crew and I'll miss them all. I'm not sure that I'll miss Elliot's geeky glasses and that damn woolly hat but I will miss Elliot — he's been a fantastic character to play and I will look back on this experience with very fond memories". A spokesperson for Channel 4 also commented on the exits, stating: "We're all sad to be losing yet more friends from the cast but everyone acknowledges that actors want to move on to pursue other roles. Nothing's been firmed up yet storyline-wise but one thing's for sure, they'll all be memorable exits."

Reflecting on his decision to leave, Davies said, "I think my character had done everything he was going to do on the show and as an actor it felt like a good time to move on. It's exciting to be back out there and auditioning for things again."

Storylines

Backstory
Elliot first appears as a very intelligent student, who is interested in aliens and paranormal studies. His interest in aliens stems back to when he was a child, when his father Gareth Bevan (Phil Howe) bought Elliot telescopes in order to look into space. Gareth had another son called Maynard, due to an affair, so walked out on Elliot and wife Bonnie (Melanie Walters). In order to protect Elliot's feelings, Bonnie raised Elliot to believe Gareth was abducted by aliens.

2007–2010
Elliot arrives in January 2007 as a radio caller who calls Kris Fisher (Gerard McCarthy) to tell him about his views on UFOs. Kris is sceptical, so Elliot meets with Kris and shows him recordings of alien sightings. Kris still refuses to believe him. However, Kris's flatmate Jessica Harris (Jennifer Biddall) publishes Elliot's theories in the college newspaper. Elliot develops feelings for Jessica and on numerous occasions tries to persuade her to go out with him. Elliot tries to stand up for Steph when she is taunted by Wayne Tunnicliffe (Joe Marsden) and Sonny Valentine (Devon Anderson). Steph tells Elliot she does not need help. When Wayne throws eggs at Elliot, Steph intervenes and helps him. After this, Elliot and Steph become friends, and Elliot takes her stargazing. Steph begins to assume Elliot has a crush on her, however he tells her he does not. Jess finds Elliot's diary in the village and publishes some of its content to the college newspaper. An angry and embarrassed Elliot attempts to buy all of the newspapers. With help from fellow student Zak Ramsey (Kent Riley), Elliot retrieves his diary from Jess. Elliot learns his mother Bonnie (Melanie Walters) has arranged a marriage for him back in Wales to a girl named Rhiannon. Steph agrees to help Elliot, by pretending to be his girlfriend, so he does not need to get married. However, Bonnie appears in the village and tells Elliot she still expects him to marry Rhiannon. Elliot then stands up to his mother, who leaves the village.

Elliot becomes friends with John Paul McQueen (James Sutton) when they take over Kris's radio station after an argument. Elliot begins to feel that the radio broadcasts are the only time anyone ever listens to him, so they agree not to tell Kris that they were the ones who took over the station. After this, Elliot falls for close friend Sarah Barnes (Loui Batley). During a date, Elliot is angered to discover it was a publicity stunt, due to Sarah's modelling career, and is upset when a reporter taunts him about his looks. Sarah, who does not acknowledge Elliot's feelings, begins an affair with Elliot's physics lecturer Roger Kiddle (Quentin Tibble). After Elliot discovers finds Sarah and Roger in bed together, he is angry, and refuses to speak to either of them. Still upset over Sarah, Elliot refuses to help Lauren Valentine (Dominique Jackson) and Barry "Newt" Newton (Nico Mirallegro) with their studies. Lauren and Newt decide to take revenge on Elliot by pretending to be Elliot's father, who Elliot believes was abducted by aliens. They lead Elliot out into the woods at night, where he believes his father is coming to meet him. Elliot begins calling for his father when he does not show. Elliot goes missing, only to turn up in hospital a few days later, suffering from hypothermia. Bonnie arrives to visit him and confesses that Elliot's father walked out on them when Elliot was a child, and was not abducted. Feeling betrayed, Elliot rids himself of all his astronomical belongings and changes his image. With this, he becomes a stronger person and stands up against Newt, Lauren, Sarah and Roger. Soon after, Elliot sees that he is not happy with his new style, so changes back and makes up with Sarah.

Weeks later, Elliot is convinced by Zak, among others, to tell Sarah how he feels about her, which he does. Initially Sarah is not interested. However, she eventually realises that she really does like Elliot and agrees to go out with him. After going on several dates, Sarah begins to put pressure on Elliot to have sex. Elliot then decides that they have little in common, so ends their relationship. Elliot then becomes close to Sarah's friend Hannah Ashworth (Emma Rigby), and begins to have feelings for her. Hannah also develops feelings for Elliot, and they begin a relationship, much to Sarah's jealousy when she catches them in bed together. However, Elliot and Hannah's relationship is also short lived, as he seems more interested in spending time with her father Nev (Jim Millea), building model rockets.

Elliot's fellow student Leila Roy (Lena Kaur) shows an interest in him and they soon begin a relationship. Leila contacts Elliot's father Gareth (Phil Howe). Elliot is reluctant to talk to his father, and is angered with Leila for interfering. After agreeing to hear Gareth's reasons for leaving him and his mother, Elliot is shocked when Gareth tells him he has another son named Maynard, Elliot's half brother. Leila grows suspicious of Gareth and calls Bonnie, who reveals Gareth had an affair, this being the reason he left her and Elliot. Elliot tells Gareth to leave, and ends his relationship with Leila. Elliot, Kris, Zak and Archie Carpenter (Stephen Beard) move into a flat together, where they find £100,000 belonging to Warren Fox (Jamie Lomas). They all agree to split the money. However, Archie calls his friend Ged Paxton (Charlie Wade) to pretend to kidnap him, claiming to be an old acquaintance of Warren's looking for the money. Elliot, Kris and Zak agree to give Ged the money, unaware it is a stitch up. Ged, however, decides he wants all of the money, and threatens to throw Archie from a roof. When Kris, Zak and Elliot discover Archie's lies, Kris throws the money over the roof and it blows away in the wind. Elliot is further betrayed by Archie when he sleeps with Leila. Elliot, Kris, Zak and Zoe Carpenter (Zoe Lister) begin a job in a call centre, where they work for Sheila Buxton (Jessica Hall). Sheila takes a liking to Elliot and they eventually start a short-lived relationship, which is ended when Elliot realises he loves Leila. Leila, however, moves to Paris to become an artist.

Elliot befriends new student Kevin Smith (Cameron Crighton), who claims to be an alien from a different planet. Elliot agrees to help him build a beacon in order to summon his race. Elliot finds Kevin's birth certificate and discovers he was abandoned by his parents at birth. Kevin later goes missing and Elliot discovers a new planet in the Solar System. He receives a job offer from NASA. Texas Longford (Bianca Hendrickse-Spendlove) is sceptical of the e-mail and tells Elliot not to trust it. However, NASA send Elliot a plane ticket to America. Realising he may never see Kevin again, Elliot hangs up his beloved hat on the beacon and leaves for his new job.

References

External links
 Character profile on the E4 website

Hollyoaks characters
Television characters introduced in 2007
Male characters in television